The Pakistan Ordnance Factories (POF) is a major firearms, defence contractor, and military corporation headquartered in Wah Cantt, Punjab, Pakistan. It is "the largest defence industrial complex under the Ministry of Defence Production, producing conventional arms & ammo to international standards. POF Board headquarter is at Wah Cantt. Presently POF  14 ordnance factories and three commercial subsidiaries. Pakistan Ordnance Factories also manufacture commercial explosives, hunting ammunition and possess extensive facilities for the manufacture of brass, copper and aluminum ingots, extrusions and sections for non-military applications. A garments factory, which has modern cloth cutting facilities, stitching units etc manufactures military uniforms and can also cater for the needs of the civil sector".

POF was founded in December 1951 by the government of Pakistan with early collaboration from the British Royal Ordnance Factory. The POF engineers, develops, produces, manufactures, and promotes a wide range of different types of infantry and special-purpose weapons, explosives, ammunition, mortars, rockets, and the military gear for Pakistan's military. Its corporate leadership comes from a deputation by GHQ where the chief of army staff (COAS) approves the appointment, but POF is under the Ministry of Defense, so the COAS is not in the direct chain of command. The POF is the earliest and one of the largest military corporations in Pakistan, and later influenced many other military corporations in the Pakistan Armed Forces.

POF produces ammunition that meets requirements set by NATO specification. Apart from military works, the POF also serves the civilian law enforcement agencies, Civil Armed Forces, and private security markets nationwide.

History

During their colonial rule, the British built sixteen ordnance factories in the British Raj, most of which were inherited by India. Pakistan's first Prime Minister, Liaquat Ali Khan, issued a directive within four months of the independence of Pakistan to establish an ordnance factory in collaboration with British Royal Ordnance Factory to manufacture 0.303 calibre rifles. In December 1951 Pakistan's second Prime Minister, Khawaja Nazimuddin, inaugurated the first four POF workshops in the small town of Wah Cantonment.

Background
Located 45 km from Islamabad and with main manufacturing facilities at Wah Cantonment, POF is a sprawling complex of fourteen production units and six subsidiaries producing conventional arms and ammunition. Research and development projects have been undertaken to minimise dependence on foreign suppliers. Efforts have been made towards self-reliance through innovation and indigenisation, for achieving the following:-

1. Optimal utilisation of surplus capacity of POF.
2. Generation of funds to supplement budget grant.
3. Participative collaboration with the private sector.
4. Enhancing exports.

POF uses technology and equipment that has been acquired from the United States, the United Kingdom, France, Germany and China. The  factories in POF employ some of the latest state of the art processes, including computerised numerical controlled machines and flexible Manufacturing systems for the production of precision components.

A Stamp was also issued by Pakistan Post on the occasion of golden jubilee of POF (Dt. 28 December 2001) to honour the country's largest defence manufacturing unit's services.

POF has been awarded standards by the International Organization for Standardization. These include ISO 9001 for quality management, ISO 14001 for environmental management, and ISO 17025 for meeting the general requirements for Competence of Test and Calibration Laboratories. In 2005, P.O.F was also awarded with safety and health environment standard OHSAS 18001.

During a visit to POF, Prime Minister Shaukat Aziz made the following tribute:
"POF is an island of excellence for Pakistan. POF and its employees have played a critical and valuable role in bolstering Pakistan’s defence. We are all proud of what you have achieved. I wish you continued success in the future."

Products

POF produce approximately 70 major products for supply to the Pakistan Army, Navy and Air Force. The main products include automatic rifles, Pistols, light/medium/heavy machine guns, a wide range of mortar and artillery ammunition, aircraft and anti-aircraft ammunition, tank and anti-tank ammunition, bombs, grenades, land mines, pyrotechnics, small ammunition, rockets, military & commercial explosives & propellants and signal stores.

Ammunition

Anti-aircraft & aircraft ammunition
 12.7x99 mm NATO
 12.7x108 mm Soviet
 14.5x114 mm Soviet
 20 mm phalanx
 23 mm
 30 mm
 35 mm
 37 mm
 57 mm
 Bomb HE AC 500 lb (250 kg)
 Bomb HE AC 1000 lb (500 kg)

Anti-tank & tank ammunition
 40 mm (RPG-7P/7AP)
 73 mm (SPG-9)
 100 mm
 105 mm
 106 mm
 125 mm
 Tungsten alloy penetrators & rods

Artillery ammunition
 88 mm howitzer
 105 mm howitzer
 122 mm howitzer
 130 mm howitzer
 155 mm howitzer
 203 mm howitzer

Anti-submarine ammunition
 Depth charge Mark II Mod 3

Military explosives and Propellants
 Artillery ammunition propellants
 Mortar and rocket ammunition propellants
 Small arms propellants
 Explosives
 Pyrotechnics

Grenades
 ARGES 84 P2A1: Fragmentation grenade
 Discharger P3 MK1: Smoke discharge/grenade
 Target Indication MK2: Targeting smoke grenade
 Fuzes, Detonators & Primers
 Demolition Stores

Mortars
 60 mm mortar/smoke/illuminating signal
 81 mm mortar/smoke/illuminating signal
 120 mm mortar/smoke

Rockets
 122 mm YARMUK Rocket

Small arms ammunition
 9x19mm Parabellum
 5.56×45mm NATO
 7.62×39mm Soviet
 7.62×51mm NATO 
 7.62×54mmR Soviet
 12 Bore Shaheen Cartridges

Infantry weapons

Pistols
 POF-X – 9 mm calibre pistol
 POF-4 – 9 mm calibre pistol (Semi-auto version of SMG-PK)
 POF-5 – 9 mm calibre pistol (Semi-auto version of HK MP5)

Sub-machine guns
 HK MP5 – 9 mm calibre sub-machine gun produced under license. Variants produced: MP5A2, MP5P3.
 SMG-PK – 9 mm calibre compact machine pistol. Variants produced: PK1.

Assault rifles
 HK G3 – 7.62×51 mm calibre assault rifle produced under license. Variants produced: G3A3, G3P4.
 BW-20 – 7.62×51 mm calibre new assault rifle. Currently in testing for pitch for Pakistan Army next-generation rifle requirements. BW-20 has some similarities with the G3 (around 30%) with the intention to keep manufacturing costs low, however the BW-20 is not an upgrade of the G3. It is a new rifle. POF is also reportedly working on 5.56×45 mm and 7.62×39 mm versions of the BW-20. The latter design will reportedly be compatible with AK magazines. POF will likely pitch the 7.62×39 mm to both the Pakistan Army and the Ministry of Interior’s (MoI) paramilitary units as service adoption for that round grows. In 2015, the Pakistan Army issued a tender for a new-generation assault rifle. It had tested many designs from all over the world, including the FN SCAR, Beretta ARX200, CZ BREN 2, AK-103 and others. In the end, however, the Army did not select any of the 7.62×51 mm designs for local adoption. There were reports of Pakistan requesting the AK-103 from Russia, but the status of that program is unclear. Ultimately, it seems that POF was given the greenlight to design an original rifle. Part of the reason seems to stem from a sense that none of the foreign designs substantially improved upon the G3 in terms of its accuracy and durability. This is not to say the other rifles were not good, but the added improvement they offered may not have justified the total cost of adopting and locally manufacturing a foreign design. 
 PK-18 – New assault rifle 7.62×51 mm calibre (Based on ArmaLite AR-10A), (G3 REPLACEMENT), status is unclear.
 PK-21 – New assault rifle/SMG 7.62×39 mm calibre (Licensed copy of AK-103), (TYPE 56 REPLACEMENT), status is unclear.

Precision rifles
 PSR-90 – 7.62×51 mm calibre sniper rifle, an indigenous variant of the HK MSG-90.
 Azb DMR MK1 – 7.62×51 mm calibre designated marksman rifle.
 Light Sniper Rifle (LSR) – .308 Winchester calibre bolt action sniper rifle.

Hunting rifles
 .308 Win Sporter – .308 Winchester calibre sporting/hunting sniper rifle.

Machine guns

 MG 3 – 7.62×51mm NATO calibre general purpose machine gun, produced under license.
 HMG PK-16 – 12.7×108mm calibre heavy machine gun, modified (Type 54P).
 Type 54P – 12.7×108mm calibre heavy machine gun (DShK variant), produced under license.

POF Eye

POF Eye is a special-purpose hand-held weapon system similar in concept to the CornerShot that can fire weapons around corners. It was first revealed at the 5th International Defence Exhibition and Seminar (IDEAS 2008), held at the Karachi Expo Centre in November 2008. It is designed for SWAT and special forces teams in hostile situations, particularly counter-terrorism and hostage rescue operations. It allows its operator to both see and attack an armed target without exposing the operator to counter-attack.

Exports
In addition to meeting the demands of Pakistan Defense Forces, POF products are in service with over 40 countries in Europe, Africa, Asia, the Middle East and the Americas. Ammunition and rifles have been exported to countries such as Iraq, Croatia and Afghanistan for their respective military establishments.

POF specializes in the manufacturing of commercial explosives, hunting ammunition and possesses extensive facilities for the manufacture of brass, copper and aluminum ingots. A state of the art garments factory, manufactures military uniforms and can also cater for the needs of the civil sector.

As of post 2010s, Pakistan has been aiming to push ahead with its export market but facing difficulties due to international guidelines enforced by the United Nations.

In 2017, the POF announced it will be opening a branch in the United Arab Emirates and targeting Middle Eastern markets where it will cater not only the needs of the host country, but throughout much of the Middle East where demands are high.

Incidents

August 2008 bombing

On 21 August 2008, POF's industrial complex was the target of twin suicide bombings by the Tehrik-i-Taliban; 68 people were killed and 81 injured in the attack.

2021 explosion

See also
List of military equipment manufactured in Pakistan
 List of modern armament manufacturers
 List of manufacturers of Lee–Enfield rifles
 Heavy Industries Taxila
 Defence Science and Technology Organization
 Pakistan Aeronautical Complex

References

External links
 

Firearm manufacturers of Pakistan
Pakistan Army affiliated organizations
Government-owned companies of Pakistan
Defence companies of Pakistan
Pakistan federal departments and agencies
Manufacturing companies established in 1951
Pakistan–United Kingdom relations
Pakistani companies established in 1951
Military research of Pakistan